Kesang may refer to:

 Kesang, Malaysia, a town in Tangkak District, Johor
 Kesang River, in Malaysia
 Kesang Marstrand, an American folk singer, songwriter, and guitarist
 Kesang Choden Wangchuck, a member of the royal family of Bhutan (sister of the current king)
 Kesang Choden Wangchuck, a member of the royal family of Bhutan (grandmother of the current king)